is a passenger railway station located in the city of Aki, Kōchi Prefecture, Japan. It is operated by the third-sector Tosa Kuroshio Railway with the station number "GN26".

Lines

Layout
The station consists of a side platform serving a single track at grade. There is no station building but a shelter comprising both an enclosed and an open compartment has been set up on the platform. A separate waiting room and bicycle shed, both built of timber, have been set up next to the ramp which leads to the platform from the station forecourt.

Adjacent stations

Station mascot
Each station on the Asa Line features a cartoon mascot character designed by Takashi Yanase, a local cartoonist from Kōchi Prefecture. The mascot for Ioki Station is a figure dressed in a business suit and hat with a box for a head and holding a briefcase. One title from the series about the traveling salesman Tora-san was to have been shot in Ioki for release in 1996 but was cancelled because of the death of the actor Kiyoshi Atsumi.

History

Passenger statistics
In fiscal 2011, the station was used by an average of 77 passengers daily.

Surrounding area
The station is located in a residential area.

See also 
List of railway stations in Japan

References

External links

Railway stations in Kōchi Prefecture
Railway stations in Japan opened in 2002
Aki, Kōchi